Number streets of St. Louis, Missouri, start at the Mississippi River and increase as they go west.  They are primarily found Downtown and in Downtown West.

1st Street
1st Street is broken by the grounds of Gateway Arch National Park, location of the Gateway Arch. South of the Memorial, it runs from Poplar Street down through the Kosiusko neighborhood to Victor Street where it dead-ends. 1st Street starts up again on Potomac Street and eventually turns into Gasconade Street. To the north, it runs from Washington Avenue as far as North Market Street (different from the downtown Market Street. 1st Street briefly shows up again in Near North Riverfront before turning into Kissock Avenue.

3rd Street
In the 1930s, the part of 3rd street beside Gateway Arch National Park (which was named Jefferson National Expansion Memorial at the time) was converted into Memorial Drive.  North of Biddle Street, 3rd merges with Broadway and continues on to the city limits.

5th Street
5th Street is officially known as Broadway.  Broadway goes as far south as Lemay in St. Louis County where it turns into Kingston Drive.  To the north, Broadway intersects with 3rd Street and runs with it as far as Riverview Blvd where it then becomes Bellefontaine Road.  Broadway is one of the major boulevards for St. Louis.  In the north it passes O'Fallon Park, Bellefontaine Cemetery, and Calvary Cemetery.

12th Street 
 
12th Street, later 12th Boulevard, is now officially known as Tucker Boulevard, renamed for former Mayor Raymond R. Tucker.  It is double sized and serves as the border between Downtown and Downtown West.

18th Street

18th Street in St. Louis, Missouri runs north–south through Downtown West.  Truman Parkway becomes 18th at Chouteau Avenue and continues north over the Union MetroLink Station.  It passes between the St. Louis Post Office and Union Station on to the Gateway Mall where it separates the Mall's Neighborhood Room from Aloe Plaza.  It continues north past the Salvation Army's Railton Building.  18th Street ends in Carr Square where it comes to a T on O'Fallon Street.

22nd Street
As part of Paul McKee's NorthSide project, the broken section of 22nd street near the I-64 interchange is to be restored and rebuilt.  A large office tower has been proposed to anchor it to the expanded Gateway Mall.

23rd Street
23rd is an irregular street that is broken up in many places.  One such break was created by the Pruitt–Igoe site.

24th Street
24th Street has disappeared over time.

25th Street
25th Street appears to the north of downtown where Jefferson Avenue curves and creates space for another road.

See also
Streets of St. Louis, Missouri

References

External links 
 
 St. Louis Street Index